August Pieper may refer to:
August Pieper (architect) (1844–1891), German architect
August Pieper (theologian) (1866–1942), German Roman Catholic theologian
August Pieper (1857–1946), German-American Lutheran theologian